Neoga is a city in Cumberland County, Illinois, United States. The population was 1,398 at the 2020 census, down from 1,636 at the 2010 census. It is part of the Charleston–Mattoon Micropolitan Statistical Area. The current mayor of Neoga is Marty Hartke. 

Neoga was incorporated in 1856. Neoga means "deer" in the Kickapoo language.

Geography
Neoga is located in northwestern Cumberland County at  (39.321769, -88.452109). U.S. Route 45 runs through the center of town as Oak Avenue, and Interstate 57 crosses the eastern side of town, with access from Exit 177, where it crosses US 45.

Demographics
As of the 2020 census there were 1,398 people, 557 households, and 337 families residing in the city. The racial makeup of the city was 93.92% White, 0.72% African American, 0.29% Native American, 0.29% Asian, 0.07% Pacific Islander, 0.93% from other races, and 3.79% from two or more races. Hispanic or Latino of any race were 1.93% of the population.

There were 557 households, out of which 71.63% had children under the age of 18 living with them, 52.42% were married couples living together, 5.39% had a female householder with no husband present, and 39.50% were non-families. 28.90% of all households were made up of individuals, and 14.90% had someone living alone who was 65 years of age or older. The average household size was 3.58 and the average family size was 2.70.

The city's age distribution consisted of 27.4% under the age of 18, 9.6% from 18 to 24, 23.4% from 25 to 44, 19.4% from 45 to 64, and 20.1% who were 65 years of age or older. The median age was 36.5 years. For every 100 females, there were 79.6 males. For every 100 females age 18 and over, there were 87.1 males.

The median income for a household in the city was $50,694, and the median income for a family was $82,813. Males had a median income of $44,881 versus $26,719 for females. The per capita income for the city was $23,353. About 9.5% of families and 12.1% of the population were below the poverty line, including 8.6% of those under age 18 and 18.9% of those age 65 or over.

Municipal government 

The Neoga City Council, composed of four councilmen and the mayor, serve as the administrative authority for the Neoga municipal government.

The City of Neoga employs 3 full-time police officers and multiple part-time police officers. Neoga is afforded fire protection services through the volunteer efforts of the Neoga Fire Protection District. The city is currently classified with a fire insurance rating of 6.

Emergency medical care is available 24 hours a day through Sarah Bush Lincoln Health Center located 15 miles northeast or through St. Anthony Memorial Hospital located 14 miles south of Neoga. The city’s medical needs are also served through the Sarah Bush Neoga Medical Center, which provides modern medical diagnostic testing and routine medical care for city residents. Emergency medical ambulance transportation is provided through the fire district.

Community facilities

Neoga is a community strongly tied to the early development of central Illinois’ railroad industry. A progressive community, Neoga hosts a variety of social events, with the largest banquet facility having a capacity of 150 persons.

Neoga hosts a strong banking and finance industry, with First Mid Bank and Trust and First Neighbor Bank having locations within Neoga. These locally managed, regional banks, with assets in excess of $600,000,000 are capable of assisting in any development projects requiring capital investment.

The Neoga News, a community newspaper, is published weekly and features news and sports coverage of interest to area residents.

The City of Neoga is home to a vibrant religious community with seven local churches.

The City of Neoga provides a variety of recreational facilities, with public parks featuring tennis and basketball courts. In addition to several area lakes with swimming, boating and water sports. For the avid outdoors person, nearby Fox Ridge and Lincoln Trail State Parks offer camping, hiking, snowmobiling, walking paths and horseback riding.

The Neoga District Library, located in downtown Neoga, affords residents with access to the latest resource materials, computers and technical services.

Education 

Neoga is home to Neoga Community Unit School District 3 which contains a elementary school and a junior-senior high school. Sports teams have the nickname "Indians".

Lake Land College, located 12 miles north of the City of Neoga, offers access to higher education and workforce training programs.

Eastern Illinois University in Charleston (25 miles north-east) provides students access to educational programs leading to bachelor's and master's degrees in a variety of academic programs.

References

External links
City of Neoga official website

Cities in Illinois
Cities in Cumberland County, Illinois
Charleston–Mattoon, IL Micropolitan Statistical Area
Populated places established in 1856